Maleylacetic acid is a chemical compound produced in the biodegradation of catechin by Bradyrhizobium japonicum.

The enzyme maleylacetate reductase uses 3-oxoadipate, NAD+, and NADP+ to produce 2-maleylacetate, NADH, NADPH, and H+.

Dicarboxylic acids